Phaleria octandra is a flowering plant in the Thymelaeaceae family. It is a shrub found in tropical Australia. It is also naturally found in the New Guinea, Indonesia, Malaysia and the Solomon Islands.

In cultivation it can grow from 3 to 6 metres tall. Leaves are 20 cm long by 7 cm wide, opposite on the stem. White fragrant flowers form from November to February, then they turn brown. Attractive red fruit form from March to April. This plant is a bird attracting.

Suited as a garden plant in tropical situations. Young plants need protection from winds, as well as plenty of shade and moisture.

References

octandra
Flora of Queensland
Flora of the Northern Territory
Flora of Malesia
Flora of Papuasia
Garden plants
Taxa named by Henri Ernest Baillon
Taxa named by Carl Linnaeus